Oedochloa ecuadoriana, synonym Echinolaena ecuadoriana, is a species of grass in the family Poaceae. It is endemic to Ecuador.

References

Panicoideae
Endemic flora of Ecuador
Grasses of South America
Near threatened flora of South America
Taxonomy articles created by Polbot
Plants described in 1994